The 1974–75 Louisville Cardinals men's basketball team represented the University of Louisville in NCAA Division I men's competition in the 1974–75 season. Coached by Denny Crum, the Cardinals won the Missouri Valley Conference title in their last season as a member (they would become a founding member of the Metro Conference the following year), and advanced to the Final Four of that season's NCAA tournament, losing in the semifinals to a UCLA team coached by Crum's retiring mentor, John Wooden.

The Cardinals played their home games at Freedom Hall, their home from the 1956–57 season until their move to the new KFC Yum! Center for the 2010–11 season.

NCAA basketball tournament
Midwest
Louisville 91, Rutgers 78
Louisville 78, Cincinnati 63
Louisville 96, Maryland 82
Final Four
UCLA 75, Louisville 74
Louisville 96, Syracuse 88 OT (3rd Place)

Awards and honors

Team players drafted into the NBA

See also
Louisville Cardinals men's basketball
1975 NCAA Division I men's basketball tournament

References

Louisville Cardinals men's basketball seasons
Louisville Cardinals
NCAA Division I men's basketball tournament Final Four seasons
Louisville
Louisville Cardinals men's basketball
Louisville Cardinals men's basketball